Travis Paul Jankowski (born June 15, 1991) is an American professional baseball outfielder in the Texas Rangers organization. He has previously played in Major League Baseball (MLB) for the San Diego Padres, Cincinnati Reds, Philadelphia Phillies, New York Mets, and Seattle Mariners.

Jankowski was born and raised in Lancaster, Pennsylvania, where he and his brother were coached in baseball by their father, a former college baseball outfielder. He played baseball and gridiron football for Lancaster Catholic High School, where he suffered a series of injuries. When Jankowski's smaller frame did not draw the attention of college football recruiters, he attended Stony Brook University on a partial baseball scholarship. During his junior year, Jankowski helped take Stony Brook to a Cinderella appearance in the 2012 College World Series. That same year, the Padres selected him in the first round of the 2012 MLB Draft.

As he rose through the Padres' farm system, Jankowski developed an offensive style of play that favored base stealing. In 2013, while playing in Minor League Baseball, he led all professional baseball players in the United States with 71 stolen bases. The following year, however, Jankowski suffered a fractured wrist while running for a fly ball. He pushed himself to return to the field prematurely, and his performance suffered as a result. Jankowski returned to the Double-A San Antonio Missions in 2015 after honing his strength and technique during the offseason, and he made his major league debut later that year.

During his full rookie season in 2016, Jankowski served as the Padres' everyday center fielder, following an injury to Jon Jay. His base stealing continued to impress, but the following year, he was shifted to left field to make room for prospect Manuel Margot. Jankowski missed most of the season with a fractured navicular bone, and the placement of the injury limited his speed upon his return. He changed his approach to the plate in 2018, but missed most of the 2019 season with a broken wrist. After the 2019 season, Jankowski was traded to the Reds, who optioned him to an alternate training site for most of the season, with occasional major league appearances as a pinch runner. In 2021, the Phillies signed Jankowski to a minor-league contract, but he was called up to the roster in May, after Roman Quinn ruptured his Achilles tendon.

Early life 
Jankowski was born on June 15, 1991, in Lancaster, Pennsylvania. His mother, Kelly, played softball, while his father, Paul, was an outfielder for Indiana University of Pennsylvania. Jankowski and his older brother, Tyler, were both coached by their father from a young age. In addition to weight training before school in the morning and team practice in the afternoon, Jankowski would practice batting by hitting into a net that his father built in their basement. As a Pennsylvania native, Jankowski and his family grew up supporting the Philadelphia Phillies of Major League Baseball (MLB).

While attending Lancaster Catholic High School, Jankowski played on both the baseball team, as an outfielder, and on the gridiron football team, as a wide receiver. He battled a series of injuries during his high school career, including a collarbone fracture, a concussion, and a sprained ankle. Nevertheless, during his junior season, Jankowski had a .471 batting average, with 25 runs scored, 20 runs batted in (RBIs), and 24 stolen bases. The Associated Press named him to the All-State First Team that season, and he helped take Lancaster Catholic to a district championship.

College career 
Following his high school graduation in 2009, Jankowski committed to play college baseball at Stony Brook University on a partial athletic scholarship. Jankowski made his college baseball debut in the second game of the Stony Brook 2010 baseball season, scoring two hits in two at bats against Akron. His first collegiate RBI came shortly afterwards, against Alabama. On March 20, 2010, Jankowski scored the go-ahead run in the eighth inning of a 3–2 victory over Iona, running home on a wild pitch from Matt Petro. Later that season, he scored the game-winning run in a 3–2 extra innings game against Albany. Defensively, his performance in center field against North Carolina State helped take Stony Brook to its first ever NCAA Tournament win. Jankowski finished his freshman season with a .262 average and 20 runs in 47 games, including 23 starts. He also led the team in stolen bases, with 13 in 14 attempts.

The summer between his freshman and sophomore year, Jankowski played collegiate summer baseball with the Marion Bobcats of the Kitty League. In 40 games with them, he led the league with a .484 batting average, 62 hits, and 45 stolen bases. Later in the summer, he was invited to play for the Bourne Braves of the Cape Cod Baseball League. In 26 at bats with Bourne, Jankowski scored five runs for a .346 average. He returned to Stony Brook as a sophomore in 2011, starting 53 games in center field. In 115 chances, Jankowski did not make a single error. Offensively, he set a school record for most stolen bases in one season, with 30 in 34 attempts, and he was 14th among all college baseball players in the nation for stolen bases. His .355 batting average was the second-highest in the America East Conference. At the end of the year, Jankowski was named to the All-America East First Team and the American Baseball Coaches Association (ABCA) All-Northeast Region second team. He was invited to rejoin the Bourne Braves in 2011, where his run production increased dramatically. Whereas Jankowski had no RBIs for the Braves in 2010, he scored 14 in the first half of the 2011 season. At the end of the season, he was named the CCBL's Most Valuable Player, leading the league with 57 hits, 31 runs scored, and seven triples.

2012 proved to be a breakout season for Jankowski, who was named a preseason All-American by Baseball America and Perfect Game USA. Throughout the regular season, he led the nation in hits, runs scored, and triples, and was within the top 10 in batting average and stolen bases. In the postseason, Jankowski served as the Seawolves' leadoff hitter during their Cinderella run to the 2012 College World Series (CWS). He scored four hits in Stony Brook's 7–2 victory over Louisiana State to take the Baton Rouge Super Regional and reach the CWS. The team's run came to an end in the CWS opener, when UCLA trounced Stony Brook 9–1. Nevertheless, Stony Brook coach Matt Senk was named national Coach of the Year, and Jankowski became Stony Brook's first ever MLB draft pick. Jankowski was inducted into the Stony Brook Hall of Fame in 2017.

Professional career

Draft and minor leagues (2012–2015) 

The San Diego Padres selected Jankowski 44th overall in the 2012 MLB Draft. He was the first of four Stony Brook players selected in that year's MLB draft, and the only outfielder. Jankowski, taken in the first round, was the highest MLB draft pick for the America East Conference since Carlos Peña, who attended Northeastern, was selected 10th overall in 1998. He and fellow Stony Brook player Maxx Tissenbaum both signed with the team on June 27, 2012, with Jankowski taking a signing bonus of $975,000.

After signing, Jankowski was assigned to the Rookie League AZL Padres. After only two games, in which he went two for eight and scored four RBIs, the Padres promoted Jankowski to the Class A Fort Wayne TinCaps of the Midwest League. Jankowski took some time within his rookie season of Minor League Baseball to find his stride, but began to settle into a rhythm by August, improving both his batting average and stolen base record, and he ended the regular season with a 17-game hitting streak. Jankowski appeared in the postseason for the TinCaps as well, driving in two runs against Noah Syndergaard, then pitching for the Lansing Lugnuts. In the second game of the Midewst League championship series against the Wisconsin Timber Rattlers, Jankowski was hit by a pitch in his first at-bat, fracturing his rib. He attempted to stay in the game, but was replaced by Mike Gallic at the end of the inning. On September 15, Jankowski was officially placed on the disabled list, effectively ending his rookie season. At the time, his hitting streak had been extended to 23 games, the longest in TinCaps history. In 256 plate appearances, Jankowski batted .282 for Fort Wayne, with one home run and 23 RBIs, and he stole 17 bases in 59 games.

Jankowski entered the 2013 season as the Padres' No. 21 prospect, as decided by Baseball America. He was assigned to the Class A-Advanced Lake Elsinore Storm of the California League, where he continued to develop his base-stealing abilities. Through mid-August, Jankowski led all professional baseball players in the United States with 71 stolen bases for the season; internationally, only Freddy Guzmán, who was playing at the time for the Delfines del Carmen of the Mexican League, had more. On August 18, Jankowski suffered a sprained ankle in a swimming pool, ending his season early. In 556 plate appearances for Lake Elsinore, Jankowski batted .286, with one home run and 38 RBI. That September, he was named a California League Post-season All-Star.

The following year, Jankowski was assigned to the Double-A San Antonio Missions. After a strong start to the season, hitting .254 in his first 67 at bats, Jankowski fractured his wrist by running headlong into the outfield fence while in pursuit of a fly ball. He underwent surgery for the injury, which fractured his elbow as well as his wrist, and, after a series of rehab assignments, returned to San Antonio for 10 games in August. Limited to only 46 minor league games in 2014, Jankowski batted .236, with 15 RBIs and 27 runs scored in 165 at bats. Jankowski later admitted that he had pushed himself too hard to return to the field in 2014, and that he continued to hone his technique the following offseason so that he could enter 2015 at full strength. He returned to Double-A in 2015, where he impressed manager Jamie Quirk in the outfield through a series of impressive catches, earning the nickname "Secretary of Defense". In late July, after hitting .316 with 23 stolen bases, Jankowski was promoted to the Triple-A El Paso Chihuahuas of the Pacific Coast League. In 24 games there, he hit .392, with nine stolen bases and eight extra-base hits.

San Diego Padres (2015–2019) 
Ahead of the September roster expansion, the Padres called Jankowski up in mid-August, serving as both an immediate replacement for Will Venable, who had been traded to the Texas Rangers, and as a possible future center field option to replace likely trade target B. J. Upton. Jankowski made his major league debut on August 22, 2015, batting ninth in the order against the St. Louis Cardinals. He singled in his first two at bats, joining John Sipin and Wiki Gonzalez as the third Padre in franchise history to record hits in his first two major league plate appearances. He also became the first Padre since Tony Gwynn to record two hits and an RBI in his debut game. The 9–3 victory ended up becoming the Padres' 500th win at their home stadium of Petco Park. Jankowski's first major league home run came the following month, knocking in three runs against the San Francisco Giants on September 13. Those would be the only runs scored by the Padres that day, in an eventual 10–3 loss. In his first year in the major leagues, Jankowski batted .211 in 90 at bats, with two home runs and 12 RBIs, and stole two bases in 96 games.

In 2016, Jankowski was selected to the Padres' 25-man opening day roster out of spring training. For the first part of the season, he was primarily used as a pinch hitter, with a handful of outfield appearances late in the game. After starting center fielder Jon Jay suffered a fractured forearm on June 19 when he was hit by a pitch from Gio Gonzalez, Jankowski was called up from the bench to start in center field. As an everyday player, he continued to impress with his frequent base-stealing. Jankowski stole home place twice that August. First, on August 1, Wil Myers placed himself in a rundown situation as a distraction, allowing Jankowski to run home in the eighth inning of a 7–3 win over the Milwaukee Brewers. Then, on August 10, he broke for home in the eighth inning of a 4–0 victory over the Pittsburgh Pirates, and was called safe when Pittsburgh catcher Eric Fryer missed the throw to home plate. In addition to his base stealing, Jankowski's 24-game hitting streak between July 31 and August 26 was the longest by a Padres rookie since Roberto Alomar in 1988. Jankowski batted .245 for the season in 383 plate appearances, with two home runs and 12 RBIs, and he stole 30 bases in 131 games.

Going into the 2017 season, Jankowski was in competition for the center field position from prospect Manuel Margot. Margot's strong spring training performance, combined with continued injuries to regular left fielder Alex Dickerson, pushed Jankowski to left field when the season opened. On April 14, Jankowski took a foul pitch off of his left foot in a game against the Atlanta Braves. He played seven games after the injury, during which his batting average dropped to .160, and CT scans later revealed that the injury, which was originally believed to be a bone bruise, was actually a fracture to the navicular bone. Jankowski began rehab assignments in July, and was optioned to the Chihuahuas as his recovery continued. After the conclusion of their playoff run, Jankowski was called back up to the Padres in September for their final 10 games of the season. He acknowledged that the injury continued to affect him at the plate even after his return, as he doubted his ability to outrun plays with the ease that he could in years prior. Making only 87 plate appearances for the Padres that year, Jankowski batted .187, with one RBI and four stolen bases in 27 games.

Jankowski began the 2018 season with the Chihuahuas, but was recalled to the Padres at the end of April, after Myers suffered an oblique strain in a game against the New York Mets. Jankowski, who admitted to being frustrated with his minor league assignment, made an immediate impact in the major leagues. On May 19, he went 3-for-5 against the Pirates, stealing two bases in the process, and making a diving catch in the ninth inning to end the game. Statcast predicted that the game-ending play had only a 25 percent chance of being caught. Jankowski, who honed his batting technique with the Chihuahuas hitting coach before his call-up, became the leadoff hitter for the Padres, where he could focus on getting on base and making contact with good pitches. On August 12, in a 9–3 win over the Philadelphia Phillies, Jankowski became the first Padre to steal four bases in a single game since Everth Cabrera in 2012. He finished the season with a .259 average, including four home runs and 17 RBIs, in 387 plate appearances, as well as 24 stolen bases in 117 games.

During a spring training game in 2019, Jankowski suffered a fractured wrist while diving after a fly ball, and he was expected to miss three months of the season while recovering. He suffered a series of setbacks after surgery, and did not return to the field until August 6. After only five days, the Padres sent him back down to El Paso, where he remained until rosters expanded on September 1. Jankowski appeared in only 25 games for the Padres in 2019, batting .182 and stealing two bases.

Cincinnati Reds (2020) 
On October 31, 2019, immediately after the conclusion of the MLB season, Jankowski was traded to the Cincinnati Reds in exchange for international bonus slot cash. As the 2020 MLB season was delayed due to the COVID-19 pandemic, Jankowski was one of 22 players sent to Prasco Park in July for additional spring training. He told reporters there that he anticipated a new extra innings rule, in which teams began with a runner on second base, would help his chances of being named to the major league roster. Jankowski was named to the Reds' opening day roster on July 24, 2020, with plans to be used as a pinch runner in later innings. After going 1 for 15 in 16 regular season games, the Reds optioned Jankowski to their alternate training site on August 26. He returned to the roster on September 30 for the postseason, and stole one base as a pinch runner in the first game of the 2020 National League Wild Card Series, against the Atlanta Braves. On October 14, Jankowski, alongside infielder Matthew Davidson and relievers Jesse Biddle and Matt Bowman, were removed from the 40-man roster. In 16 games for the Reds, Jankowski batted .067, with one hit and two stolen bases.

Philadelphia Phillies (2021) 
On February 15, 2021, Jankowski signed a minor league contract with the Philadelphia Phillies, a deal which included an invitation to spring training. On May 30, after outfielder Roman Quinn suffered a ruptured Achilles tendon and was expected to miss the remainder of the 2021 MLB season, Jankowski was promoted from the Triple-A Lehigh Valley IronPigs to take his place in the roster. He debuted with the team on June 4, replacing Rhys Hoskins in the ninth inning of a game against the Washington Nationals. Jankowski was caught stealing by Nationals catcher Alex Avila, a play which led to booing from Phillies fans at Citizens Bank Park. He used the incident to focus on improving his offensive performance, and improved to nine hits in his first 26 at bats. Jankowski hit .252/.364/.351 with 1 home run and 10 RBI in 76 games for Philadelphia in 2021. On November 5, 2021, Jankowski was outrighted off of the 40-man roster and elected free agency.

New York Mets (2022) 
On March 17, 2022, the New York Mets signed Jankowski to a minor-league contract with an invitation to spring training. On April 6, the Mets selected Jankowski's contract, adding him to their opening day roster. In his first start on April 9, he stole two bases against the Nationals. In the Mets' home opener against the Diamondbacks on April 15, he had a three-hit game.

Jankowski served as the Mets' fourth outfielder. He broke his hand on May 25 after making a diving catch to rob Giants catcher Joey Bart of a hit, and was placed on the injured list expected to miss six to eight weeks. As of July 11, 2022, Jankowski is back on Monday against Braves on the road trip. On July 29, 2022, Jankowski was designated for assignment by the Mets.

Seattle Mariners (2022) 
On August 1, 2022, Jankowski was claimed off waivers by the Seattle Mariners. He was designated for assignment on August 5. On August 9, Jankowski declined being optioned to Triple-A and elected free agency.

New York Mets (Second Stint) 
On August 13, 2022, the New York Mets resigned Jankowski to a minor-league contract. He elected free agency on November 10, 2022.

Texas Rangers
On January 27, 2023, Jankowski signed a minor league contract with the Texas Rangers organization.

International career 
In 2015, Jankowski served as the leadoff hitter for Team USA at the Pan American Games. His banner moment in the series came in the semifinal rounds against Cuba. In the ninth inning, Jankowski singled to center field, then quickly stole second base before Andy Parrino drove the run in, pushing Team USA to the finals. The team ultimately took silver in the tournament.

Player profile 
Jankowski has developed a batting style that favors putting balls in play rather than aiming for home runs. Critical to this process has been a better sense of pitch discipline, swinging only when he believes that he can be productive. This was seen most effectively during the 2018 season, in which he served as the Padres' leadoff hitter. After three seasons of swinging at 22 percent or more of pitches outside the strike zone, he dropped that number to 13.8 percent. He has also developed a reputation as an elite base stealer, another skill that he attributes to discipline. Jankowski has watched videos of the pitchers that he faces so that he can understand how they react with a runner on base, and he uses that information to decide whether or not to attempt to steal. He is adamant that speed alone is insufficient to become a notable base stealer, and that "There are more runners in baseball than base stealers."

For most of his career, Jankowski has seen heavy competition for limited outfield positions. In addition to his offensive production, he has expanded his versatility by learning how to play in all three outfield positions. In 2016, while serving primarily as a relief in right field for starter Matt Kemp, Padres manager Andy Green said that "Travis has more range than 99.9 percent of all outfielders in major league baseball". While playing in Double-A, Jankowski's strong defensive performance in center field drew comparisons to players such as Devon White and Willie Wilson, while his nickname, "Secretary of Defense", was originally held by former Phillies center fielder Garry Maddox.

Personal life
Jankowski married his wife, Lindsey, on October 27, 2017. His Padres teammates Cory Spangenberg and Colin Rea served as groomsmen at the wedding. The couple have two sons and one daughter together. They reside in Lancaster during the offseason.

Jankowski has gone by the nickname "Freddy" since his high school baseball career. The name originated from a childhood fascination with Fred Rogers, the host of Mister Rogers' Neighborhood. While playing with the Reds in 2020, Jankowski was also frequently mistaken for retired pitcher Bronson Arroyo due to their similar frames and long blond hair.

References

External links

1991 births
Living people
All-American college baseball players
American people of Slavic descent
Arizona League Padres players
Baseball players at the 2015 Pan American Games
Pan American Games medalists in baseball
Pan American Games silver medalists for the United States
Baseball players from Pennsylvania
Bourne Braves players
Cincinnati Reds players
El Paso Chihuahuas players
Eugene Emeralds players
Fort Wayne TinCaps players
Lake Elsinore Storm players
Lehigh Valley IronPigs players
Major League Baseball center fielders
Medalists at the 2015 Pan American Games
New York Mets players
Philadelphia Phillies players
San Antonio Missions players
San Diego Padres players
Seattle Mariners players
Sportspeople from Lancaster, Pennsylvania
Stony Brook Seawolves baseball players
United States national baseball team players
Syracuse Mets players